Franciszek Bujak  (16 August 1875, in Maszkienice near Brzesko – 21 March 1953, in Kraków) was a Polish academic and historian of economic, political and social history of Poland. He served as professor of the Jagiellonian University twice, in 1909–1918 (before the re-emergence of the sovereign Poland) and after World War II in 1946–1952. In the interwar Poland, Bujak was a professor of the Warsaw University in 1919–1921, and the John Casimir University in Lwów in 1921–1941 (until the outbreak of Operation Barbarossa). He was a member of the Polish Academy of Sciences since 1952, and president of the Polish Historical Society twice in 1932–1933 and 1936–1937. He was active politically in PSL "Piast" and Stronnictwo Ludowe, briefly serving as minister of agriculture under Władysław Grabski.

Bujak was the founder of an original research school of Poland's rural economic history. He published a series of scientific monographs called Badania Dziejów Społecznych i Gospodarczych (1931–1950), and founded the academic journal Roczniki Dziejów Społecznych i Gospodarczych. He is the author of numerous dissertations including Studia nad osadnictwem Małopolski (1905), and Wieś zachodniogalicyjska u schyłku XIX w, as well as his first groundbreaking analysis of economic situation of a village during the Partitions of Poland called Żmiąca wieś powiatu limanowskiego. Stosunki gospodarcze i społeczne (1903).

References

20th-century Polish historians
Polish male non-fiction writers
Polish politicians
1875 births
1953 deaths
Academic staff of Jagiellonian University